Adrián Nicolás Luna Retamar (born 12 April 1992) is a Uruguayan professional footballer who plays as a midfielder, winger or forward for Indian Super League club Kerala Blasters.

Club career

Youth and early career
Born in Tacuarembó, Luna began his youth career at academies of Progreso, Montevideo Wanderers and Defensor Sporting in Uruguay. He was eventually promoted to Defensor's U-19 and first team in 2010. Luna made his first team debut with Defensor Sporting, on 6 February 2010, against Nacional.
In the 2010–11 season Luna was a regular starter for Defensor. He played 41 matches for the Uruguayan club and scored 6 goals.
On 23 May 2011, Luna signed a contract with La Liga club Espanyol, with a €1 million fee.

On 17 August 2011, Luna was loaned to Segunda División club Gimnàstic.
However, in January 2012, Luna returned to Espanyol and signed a contract with CE Sabadell, in a six-month loan.
In August 2012, Luna was loaned to Club Nacional de Football, returning to his country. On 2 September 2013, his contract with Espanyol was rescinded.

On 18 September 2013, he returned to Defensor and stayed at the club for two seasons.

C.D. Veracruz 
In September 2015, Luna moved to Mexico, where he joined Liga MX club C.D. Veracruz on a two-year deal. On 4 September 2015, He was loaned out to Venados and represented the Mexican club for one season. He returned from loan in 2016, and went on to play for Veracruz in three seasons.

Melbourne City 

On 19 July 2019, Luna signed for Australian club Melbourne City on a two-year deal. In July 2021, Luna left the club at the end of his contract, having scored 8 goals in 51 appearances.

Kerala Blasters

2021–22: Debut season 

On 22 July 2021, Kerala Blasters announced that Luna had joined the Indian Super League club on a two-year deal. He made his debut for the club on 11 September 2021 against Indian Navy in the 2021 Durand Cup tournament. Luna scored from a penalty during the match and became the club's first ever goalscorer in Durand Cup. He made his first league appearance in the season opener against ATK Mohun Bagan FC on 19 November, which ended in a 4–2 defeat for Kerala Blasters. He was the assist provider of the second goal scored by Jorge Pereyra Díaz for the Blasters in the game. On 5 December 2021, Luna helped the Blasters to register their first victory of the season against Odisha FC by providing two assists in a match which they won 2–1, and was the recipient of the man of the match award in the game. He was again awarded with the man of the match award in the next game against East Bengal on 12 December, which they drew 1–1. Disappointed by the match officials, Luna expressed his frustration on the referees in the post-match conference. He scored his first league goal for  the Blasters' in a 0–3 victory over rivals Chennaiyin FC on 22 December, and was again awarded with the man of the match award. On 2 January 2022, he scored his second goal in the match against FC Goa, where he scored a long-ranger from 30 yards out in a match that ended in a 2–2 draw. After the club captain Jessel Carnerio was declared injured, Luna spent much of the season as club captain in his absence. He played his first match as the captain against Odisha in the second phase of the season, where he assisted for two goals that helped Kerala Blasters to win the game 0–2 on 12 January 2022. He scored a brace against ATK Mohun Bagan on 19 February, where he netted his first goal through a free-kick, and following from the edge of the penalty box. The match in a 2–2 draw at full-time. Luna scored another free-kick in the following match against Chennaiyin on 26 February, which ensured the Blasters a 3–0 victory. His goal in the second leg of the semi-final match against Jamshedpur FC on 15 March sealed the Blasters a place in the final, as the Blasters won 2–1 on aggregate score, and qualified for the finals for the third time in their history.

2022–23: Contract extension 
On 22 July 2022, Luna signed a two-year contract extension with Kerala Blasters till 2024.

On 7 October 2022, Luna helped the Blasters in a 3–1 victory against East Bengal in the 2022–23 season opener by scoring the first goal of the game. He teared up after scoring the goal, pointed to the sky and dedicated it to his daughter Julieta, who died on 9 April 2022. "It was a special goal for me because everyone knows what I’m going through…me, my wife, family, son. This goal was for my little daughter,” Luna said after the match. He scored his second goal of the season on 12 November against FC Goa, where he scored the opening goal of the match as the Blasters ended up winning the game 3–1 at full-time. On 4 December, Luna surpassed the club's record of most appearances by a foreign player by making his 31st appearance for the Blasters in a 1–0 win against Jamshedpur FC, where he provided the assist for Dimitrios Diamantakos. Luna netted his third goal of the season in the returning fixture against Jamshedpur on 3 January 2023, where he scored a 'perfectly set-up team-goal' as the Blasters won their eighth match of the season by the score of 3–1. On 7 February, Luna scored a goal and provided an assist in their 2–1 derby match win against Chennaiyin and won the hero of the match award for his two goal contribution in the match.

International career

Luna has been capped by the Uruguay national under-17 football team for the 2009 FIFA U-17 World Cup. He has also represented Uruguay national under-20 football team for the 2011 South American Youth Championship and the 2011 FIFA U-20 World Cup. He has totally made 19 appearances across both the age groups.

Personal life 
On 4 July 2022, Luna revealed through social media that his six-year-old daughter Julieta died on 9 April 2022 after a battle with cystic fibrosis. In August 2022, Luna married his long-time girlfriend Mariana Hernandez.

Career statistics

Club

International

Scores and results list Uruguay's goal tally first, score column indicates score after each Luna goal.

Honours

Club

Melbourne City 
 A-League Premiership: 2020–21
 A-League Championship: 2021

Kerala Blasters 
 Indian Super League runner-up: 2021–22

Personal 

 Kerala Blasters Fans' Player of the Season: 2021–22, 2022–23

References

External links
CE Sabadell official profile
Gimnàstic official profile 

1992 births
Living people
People from Tacuarembó
Association football midfielders
Uruguayan footballers
Uruguay under-20 international footballers
Uruguay youth international footballers
Uruguayan Primera División players
Segunda División players
Liga MX players
Ascenso MX players
A-League Men players
Indian Super League players
Defensor Sporting players
RCD Espanyol footballers
Gimnàstic de Tarragona footballers
CE Sabadell FC footballers
Club Nacional de Football players
C.D. Veracruz footballers
Venados F.C. players
Melbourne City FC players
Kerala Blasters FC players
Uruguayan expatriate footballers
Uruguayan expatriate sportspeople in Spain
Uruguayan expatriate sportspeople in Mexico
Uruguayan expatriate sportspeople in Australia
Uruguayan expatriate sportspeople in India
Expatriate footballers in Spain
Expatriate footballers in Mexico
Expatriate soccer players in Australia
Expatriate footballers in India